Cyclophora heydena is a moth in the family Geometridae first described by Charles Swinhoe in 1894. It is found in the north-eastern Himalayas and on Borneo and Java.

Subspecies
Cyclophora heydena heydena
Cyclophora heydena victrix (Prout, 1938)

References

Moths described in 1894
Moths of Asia
Sterrhinae